Rings Beach is a beach settlement on the Coromandel Peninsula of New Zealand, between Matarangi on the west and Kūaotunu on the east. The eastern end of the settlement is known as Kūaotunu West. 

The beach was named after Frank Ring, a local sheep farmer. He was the son of Charles Ring who discovered gold in the Coromandel in 1852.

Rings Beach loop track is a walking track through forest and wetlands inland from the beach.

Demographics
Rings Beach is described by Statistics New Zealand as a rural settlement. Rings Beach is part of the larger Mercury Bay North statistical area.

Rings Beach had a population of 120 at the 2018 New Zealand census, an increase of 21 people (21.2%) since the 2013 census, and unchanged since the 2006 census. There were 54 households, comprising 57 males and 63 females, giving a sex ratio of 0.9 males per female. The median age was 63.4 years (compared with 37.4 years nationally), with 12 people (10.0%) aged under 15 years, 12 (10.0%) aged 15 to 29, 45 (37.5%) aged 30 to 64, and 54 (45.0%) aged 65 or older.

Ethnicities were 97.5% European/Pākehā, 2.5% Māori, and 2.5% Asian. People may identify with more than one ethnicity.

Although some people chose not to answer the census's question about religious affiliation, 60.0% had no religion, 32.5% were Christian, and 2.5% were Hindu.

Of those at least 15 years old, 33 (30.6%) people had a bachelor's or higher degree, and 21 (19.4%) people had no formal qualifications. The median income was $25,600, compared with $31,800 nationally. 9 people (8.3%) earned over $70,000 compared to 17.2% nationally. The employment status of those at least 15 was that 27 (25.0%) people were employed full-time, 21 (19.4%) were part-time, and 3 (2.8%) were unemployed.

References

Thames-Coromandel District
Populated places in Waikato
Beaches of Waikato